Licensing means renting or leasing of an intangible asset. It is a process of creating and managing contracts between the owner of a brand and a company or individual who wants to  use the brand in association with a product, for an agreed period of time, within an agreed territory. Licensing is used by brand owners to extend a trademark or character onto products of a completely different nature.

Examples of intangible assets include a song ("Somewhere Over The Rainbow"), a character (Donald Duck), a name (Michael Jordan), or a brand (The Ritz-Carlton). An arrangement to license a brand requires a licensing agreement. A licensing agreement authorizes a company which markets a product or service (a licensee) to lease or rent a brand from a brand owner who operates a licensing program (a licensor).

History 
Brand licensing is a well-established business, both in the area of patents and trademarks. Trademark licensing has a rich history in American business, largely beginning with the rise of mass entertainment such as the movies, comics and later television. Mickey Mouse's popularity in the 1930s and 1940s resulted in an explosion of toys, books, and consumer products with the lovable rodent's likeness on them, none of which were manufactured by the Walt Disney Company.

This process accelerated as movies and later television became a staple of American business. The rise of brand licensing did not begin until much later, when corporations found that consumers would actually pay money for products with the logos of their favorite brands on them. McDonald's play food, Burger King T-shirts and even ghastly Good Humor Halloween costumes became commonplace. Brand extensions later made the brand licensing marketplace much more lucrative, as companies realized they could make real dollars renting out their equity to manufacturers. Instead of spending untold millions to create a new brand, companies were willing to pay a royalty on net sales of their products to rent the product of an established brand name. Armor All auto vacuums, Breyers yogurt, TGI Friday's frozen appetizers, and Lucite nail polish are only a handful of the products carrying well-known brand names which are made under license by companies unrelated to the companies who own the brand.

Reasons for licensing 
A company may choose to license its brand(s) when they believe there is strong consumer acceptance for brand extensions or products.

Apart from benefits to licensors, there are benefits to licensees as well. Licensees lease the rights to a brand for incorporation into their merchandise, but do not share ownership in it. Having access to major national and global brands, and the logos and trademarks associated with those brands, gives the licensee significant benefits. The most important of these is the marketing power the brand brings to the licensee's products. When brand managers enter or extend into new product categories via licensing they create an opportunity for a licensee to grow their company. Below is an example of the licensed product process steps:

 Licensor chooses the product categories to be licensed   
 Licensor finds and negotiates a license with the best licensees   
 Licensees develop concepts, prototypes and final production samples and submit for approval   
 Licensor approves licensed products for sale   
 Licensees sell licensed products to authorized retailers

Licensees expect that the license will provide them with sales growth. This sales growth may be in the form of growth within existing market or the opportunity to enter a new market. To achieve this, licensees expect that the brand they are licensing has significant brand preference, that it will open doors and ultimately help them meet or exceed their business objectives. The licensing contract forces the licensee to achieve certain sales targets and royalties; therefore, the goal of the licensee is to quickly meet their business objectives, thereby achieving their contract obligations. Royalties are the money paid to a licensor by the licensee for the right to use the licensed property. It is calculated by multiplying the Royalty Rate by the Net Sales.

Global brand licensing industry 

The main international professional association for brand licensing is the Licensing Industry Merchandiser's Association, which sponsors the annual Licensing International Expo.

Each May, License! Global magazine publishes an annual list of "The Top 150 Global Licensors". For 2017, the leader was Disney Consumer Products with $53 billion in retail sales of licensed merchandise, followed by Meredith Corp. with $23.2 Billion and PVH with $18 Billion.

According to the International Licensing Industry Merchandisers' Association (LIMA), global licensed merchandise sales was $272.2 billion in 2016, versus $262.2 billion in 2015.

Brand licensing in South Korea 
Han Chang-Wan, a professor at Sejong University, published the history of animation character design in Korea at the Character Licensing Fair 2016. This study became the first to have rabbit and turtle illustrations as Korean animated characters. This was revealed in 'The Independent' newspaper.

With American and Japanese characters dominating the Korean animation industry until the 1970s, it wasn't until 1983 when Dooly the Little Dinosaur (아기 공룡 둘리) appeared in Bomulsum—a monthly magazine for kids—and changed the Korean character market. In 1987, Dooly the Little Dinosaur first aired as a six-part TV show, with another seven parts airing in 1988. In 1995, Kim Soo-jung, its creator, established a company named 'Dooly World' and went into the character design industry. The following year, the animated movie 'Dooly the Little Dinosaur' was released. In the 30 years since Dooly the Little Dinosaur launched, its related market generated 2–3 billion won per year (about 1.7–2.7 million dollars as of July 2018). This paved the way for the character market in Korea.

Brand licensing in India 

The liberalisation of the Indian economy in 1992 brought a slew of international brands to India. Many of these brands have been licensed to Indian companies. Arvind represent Arrow, Cherokee, ELLE, Nautica, USPA, Aéropostale, CHILDRENS PLACE, Ed Hardy, GAP and Kipling. The Murjani Group is the licensee for Calvin Klein Jeans, FCUK and Tommy Hilfiger. Beverly Hills Polo Club (BHPC) is licensed to Spencers Retail.

Character Licensing is another big licensing segment of brand licensing in India. The big players in the character licensing industry in India are Disney India, Viacom 18 and Cartoon Network Enterprises. Characters licensed out by Disney India include Mickey Mouse and Donald Duck. Viacom has brought in popular characters from Nickelodeon like Dora the Explorer and SpongeBob SquarePants. Cartoon Network boasts of a portfolio including characters such as Ben 10, Powerpuff Girls, Mr. Bean, Roll no. 21, We Bare Bears.

Brand licensing in Italy 

Brand Licensing in Italy started in the seventies with very few Licensing Agencies. Apart from Disney which had its own dedicated office in the market, all the other big Entertainment majors were represented by independent agencies. One of these companies named DIC 2 (Distribution International Characters), founded in 1973 by Gianfranco Mari contributed to create the licensing business in Italy and set big phenomena as He-Man and the Masters of the Universe, Marvel Comics, Star Wars, Hanna & Barbera characters, Zorro, Asterix and so on. DIC 2 is still one of the biggest independent agencies in Italy, representing different cartoon characters and famous brands.

References 

Brand management
Intellectual property law